Teenage Triangle  is a joint compilation album by three pop artists, Shelley Fabares, James Darren and Paul Petersen, all of whom were cast members on The Donna Reed Show. It was released in 1963 on Colpix Records and included 12 tracks with four songs from each of the three singers, most of which were previously released. The album was produced and arranged by Stu Phillips. It was available in both mono and stereo, catalogue numbers CP-444 and SCP-444.

A follow-up compilation featuring the same artists, More Teenage Triangle, was released by Colpix in 1964.

Reception
Teenage Triangle peaked on the Billboard Top LPs chart at No. 48 in May 1963. Seven of the singles were U.S. Top 40 hits; two from Fabares, two from Petersen and three from Darren.

Track listing

Side 1

Side 2

Charts

Re-release
In 1999, both Teenage Triangle and More Teenage Triangle were released for the first time on compact disc in their entirety as a "twofer" CD by Westside Records. It included the original liner notes from the albums.

References

1963 compilation albums
Shelley Fabares albums
James Darren albums
Paul Petersen albums
Colpix Records compilation albums
Split albums